, better known by his stage name , is a Japanese lyricist, composer and poet who is affiliated with Amuse, Inc. He has written over 2,000 songs for numerous artists such as Kyosuke Himuro, Takuro Yoshida and Junichi Inagaki and theme songs for anime series including Dragon Ball Z. His younger brother is Hideharu Mori, keyboardist of the rock band Picasso.

Career
Mori attended the English Department of Sophia University before dropping out and making his professional songwriting debut in 1975. His first album, was released in 1977.

He contributed a handful of lyrics to the 1989 album Appare by the Sadistic Mika Band, who temporarily reunited that year.

He penned the lyrics to several songs used in Dragon Ball Z, including its opening themes "Cha-La Head-Cha-La" and "We Gotta Power" and its second ending theme "Bokutachi wa Tenshi Datta", all three of which are performed by Hironobu Kageyama.

Mori was hired by hide of X Japan to pen the lyrics to the first two singles of his solo career, 1993's simultaneously released "Eyes Love You" and "50% & 50%". Twenty years later, the lyricist covered "Eyes Love You" himself together with Hisashi Imai of Buck-Tick for the 2013 hide tribute album Tribute VII -Rock Spirits-.

In 1996 he worked on the first solo single of another X Japan member, "Meikyuu no Lovers" by Heath, which was used as the second ending theme of the long-running Detective Conan anime.

In 1997, Mori released the album  which featured Hisashi Imai on several tracks.
It was followed by Poetic Evolution in 1999 which in addition to Imai also featured Teru, Takuro and Hisashi of Glay, Takuya (Judy and Mary) and Kyoji Yamamoto of Bow Wow. The album  was released in 2006 as a tribute to the lyricist and contains covers of songs Mori wrote by artists such as Bonnie Pink and Porno Graffitti.

The songwriter returned to Dragon Ball in 2009 when he wrote "Kuu•Zen•Zetsu•Go" as the opening theme for Dragon Ball Kai. For 2015's Fukkatsu no F film, he wrote lyrics inspired by the series for its theme song "Z no Chikai". That year he also penned "Chōzetsu☆Dynamic!" by Kazuya Yoshii of The Yellow Monkey, which is the first opening theme song of Dragon Ball Super. Mori also wrote the lyrics to its second opening theme, 2017's "Genkai Toppa × Survivor", a rock song by enka singer Kiyoshi Hikawa with music composed by Takafumi Iwasaki.

Mori wrote the script for the 2012 rock opera Psychedelic Pain after being convinced to do so by his friend Tomoyasu Hotei, who served as musical director.

In 2013 he wrote "V.S. Myself", Show-Ya's first single since reuniting in 2005. That year he also wrote the single "Kiss or Bite" off of Meg's album Continue.

Selected credits
 "Shiroi Honō" (1985)
 "Kanashimi yo Konnichi wa" (1986)
 "Cha-La Head-Cha-La" (1989)
 "Eyes Love You" (1993)
 "50% & 50%" (1993)
 "Z no Chikai" (2015)
 "Chōzetsu☆Dynamic!" (2015)

References

External links
 
 

1954 births
Japanese composers
Japanese lyricists
Japanese male composers
Japanese poets
Living people
Musicians from Tokyo
Amuse Inc. talents